Federico Capece (born 19 February 1976) is an Argentine footballer who plays as a midfielder. He is currently unattached.

See also
Football in Argentina
List of football clubs in Argentina

References

External links
 Federico Capece's profile on San Marino Calcio's official website

1976 births
Living people
Footballers from Buenos Aires
Argentine footballers
Association football midfielders
All Boys footballers
Club Atlético Atlanta footballers
Club Atlético Tigre footballers
A.S.D. Victor San Marino players